Phiphidi Dam is dam in South Africa. It was established in 1971.

See also
List of reservoirs and dams in South Africa

References 
 List of South African Dams from the Department of Water Affairs

Dams in South Africa
Dams completed in 1971